Lee Capes (born 3 October 1961) is an Australian former field hockey player who competed in the 1988 Summer Olympics, winning the gold medal.

Her husband Michael Nobbs, daughter Kaitlin Nobbs, sister Michelle Capes and brother-in-law Mark Hager have all represented their nation in the games in the same sport.

References

External links
 

1961 births
Living people
Australian female field hockey players
Olympic field hockey players of Australia
Field hockey players at the 1988 Summer Olympics
Olympic gold medalists for Australia
Olympic medalists in field hockey
Medalists at the 1988 Summer Olympics
Field hockey players from Perth, Western Australia
Sportswomen from Western Australia
Sportspeople from Fremantle
20th-century Australian women